Nimi Dimkpa Briggs (born 22 February 1944) is a Nigerian academic, scholar and Emeritus Professor of  Obstetrics and Gynaecology.

Education
Briggs had his early education at Nyemoni Grammar School Abonnema and Baptist High School, Port Harcourt. Later, he enrolled at  Government College Umuahia where he completed his secondary education. In June 1969, he received his bachelor's degree in  Medicine and Surgery from the University of Lagos, Nigeria.

Career
Briggs served as the Vice-Chancellor of University of Port Harcourt twice. First, as Acting Vice-Chancellor from 1995 to 96 before he was appointed again in 2000 serving until 2005. He is the former Chairman Committee of Vice Chancellors of Nigerian Universities and the Chairman of the Board of the National Hospital. Between 2007 and 2008, he was appointed Chairman of the Rivers State Economic Advisory Council and the Rivers State Community Foundation as well as, Director of Centre for Health and Development, University of Port Harcourt.

Other positions held
University of Port Harcourt
Head of Department of Obstetrics and Gynaecology: 1980 - 1993
Professor of Obstetrics and Gynaecology: 1990
Provost of College of Health Sciences: 1993 - 1995, 1996 - 1998
Rivers State Independent Electoral Commission
Chairman: 2007 – 2011
University of Benin Teaching Hospital
Chairman, Board of Management: 2009 – 2011
Alex Ekwueme Federal University Ndufu-Alike (AEFUNAI)
Pro-Chancellor Alex Ekwueme Federal University Ndufu-Alike: 2020-Date

See also
List of people from Rivers State

References

Further reading

External links
Prof. Nimi Briggs website
Prof. Nimi Briggs profile from RSEAC

1944 births
Living people
Educators from Rivers State
Academic staff of the University of Port Harcourt
Medical doctors from Rivers State
Nigerian academics
Heads of Rivers State government agencies and parastatals
University of Benin (Nigeria) people
University of Lagos alumni
Government College Umuahia alumni
Nigerian Christians